Isaiah Oliver (born September 30, 1996) is an American football cornerback for the San Francisco 49ers of the National Football League (NFL). He played college football at Colorado, and was drafted by the Atlanta Falcons in the second round of the 2018 NFL Draft.

Early years
Oliver attended Brophy College Preparatory in Phoenix. He played both wide receiver and cornerback on the high school football team. Coming out of high school, he was a three-star recruit according to ESPN.com. He committed to the Colorado to play college football despite having offers from Arizona and New Mexico. Oliver also ran track in high school, posting a personal best time of 10.56 seconds in the 100 meter dash.

College career
Oliver played at Colorado from 2015 to 2017. During his collegiate career, he had 82 total tackles and three interceptions. After his junior season in 2017, Oliver decided to forgo his senior year and enter the 2018 NFL Draft. Oliver was also a member of Colorado's track and field team.

Professional career

Atlanta Falcons
The Atlanta Falcons selected Oliver in the second round (58th overall) of the 2018 NFL Draft. Oliver was the eighth cornerback drafted in 2018.

On May 9, 2018, the Atlanta Falcons signed Oliver to a four-year, $4.63 million contract that includes $2.14 million guaranteed and a signing bonus of $1.45 million.

Oliver recorded his first career interception during Week 16 against the Carolina Panthers.

In week 2 of the 2019 season against the Philadelphia Eagles, Oliver recorded 6 tackles in the 24-20 win.  On fourth and 8 with one minute left in the game, Oliver tackled tight end Zach Ertz just short of the first down marker, sealing a Falcons win.

In Week 8 of the 2020 season against the Carolina Panthers on Thursday Night Football, Oliver recorded his first career sack on Teddy Bridgewater during the 25–17 Falcons' victory.

Oliver entered the 2021 season as a Falcons starting cornerback. He suffered a knee injury in Week 4 and was placed on injured reserve on October 5, 2021.

On March 18, 2022, Oliver signed a one-year contract extension with the Falcons. He was placed on injured reserve on September 1, 2022. He was activated on October 15.

San Francisco 49ers
On March 15, 2023, Oliver signed a two-year deal with the San Francisco 49ers.

Personal life
Oliver's father, Muhammad, played in the NFL. His uncle, Damon Mays, also played in the NFL.

References

External links
Draft & Combine Profile - Isaiah Oliver|website=www.nfl.com|language=en-US|access-date=2018-04-28
Atlanta Falcons bio
Colorado Buffaloes bio
Twitter

1996 births
Living people
Players of American football from Phoenix, Arizona
American football cornerbacks
Colorado Buffaloes football players
Atlanta Falcons players
San Francisco 49ers players
Ed Block Courage Award recipients